Ronald Humpston (14 December 1924 – 4 January 2012) was a former professional footballer, who played for Portsmouth, Huddersfield Town & Headington United. He was born in Derby.

References

1924 births
2012 deaths
English footballers
Footballers from Derby
Association football goalkeepers
English Football League players
Portsmouth F.C. players
Huddersfield Town A.F.C. players
Oxford United F.C. players
Grimsby Town F.C. non-playing staff